Kolasib district is one of the eleven districts of Mizoram state in India. It is the smallest district in Mizoram with an area of 1,386 km2(535 sq mi).

Geography
The district is bounded on the north and northwest by Hailakandi district of Assam state, on the west by Mamit district, on the south and east by Aizawl district and on the northeast by Cachar district of Assam state. The district occupies an area of 1382.51 km². Kolasib town is the administrative headquarters of the district.

Hydrology
Kolasib district has one completed Dam, Serlui B Dam and two under construction Bairabi Dam and Tuirial Dam Construction recommenced in September 2011.

Divisions
The district has two R.D. Blocks: Bilkhawthlir and Thingdawl. It also has three assembly constituencies: Tuirial, Kolasib and Serlui.

Demographics

According to the 2011 census Kolasib district has a population of 83,955, roughly equal to the nation of Andorra. This gives it a ranking of 620th in India (out of a total of 640). Its population growth rate over the decade 2001-2011 was 27.28%. Kolasib has a sex ratio of 956 females for every 1000 males, and a literacy rate of 93.50%.

References

External links
 Kolasib district website
 Kolasib website

 
Districts of Mizoram